Schönemann, also spelled Schoenemann, is a German surname. 
"Schaneman", is the modern spelling.

See:

 Dora Schönemann (born 1911), German swimmer
 Hinnerk Schönemann (born 1974),  German actor
 Lili Schönemann (1758–1817), daughter of a banker from Frankfurt
 Peter Schönemann, German psychometrician and statistician
 Theodor Schönemann (1812–1868), German mathematician